Stuttgart Army Airfield is the name of two US Army installations:

 for the World War II base see Stuttgart Army Airfield (Arkansas)
 for the current base see Stuttgart Army Airfield (Germany)